The 2018 L'Alcúdia International Football Tournament was a football competition that took place in July and August 2018. The 2018 edition was the third to feature only international youth teams. Previous editions have contained a mix of national selections and club selections.

Teams
The participating teams were:

 Valenciana

Group stage

Group A

Group B

Knockout stage

Bracket

Semi-finals

Final

References 

International association football competitions hosted by Spain
Youth association football competitions for international teams
2018 in association football
2018–19 in Spanish football
July 2018 sports events in Spain
August 2018 sports events in Spain